Golden-spectacled warbler was a common name for birds in the Seicurcus burkii species complex, which included birds now known as:

 Green-crowned warbler (Seicercus burkii)
 Martens's warbler (Seicercus omeiensis)
 Alström's warbler (Seicercus soror)
 Grey-crowned warbler (Seicercus tephrocephalus)
 Bianchi's warbler (Seicercus valentini)
 Whistler's warbler (Seicercus whistleri)

Animal common name disambiguation pages